Events from the year 1929 in Romania. The year was dominated by the Great Depression. Romania won on the first Balkan Cup, held this year.

Incumbents
 King: Michael I. 
 Prime Minister: Iuliu Maniu

Events
 12 January – The Romanian Radio Broadcasting Company broadcasts its first program for children, Children's Hour.
 7 February – The Monetary Act lays down the gold standard for the Romanian leu.
 30 March – Romania signs the Litvinov Protocol.
 11 May – The first Balkan Cup is initiated with Romania a founding competitor.
 July – Increasing price shocks and a dramatic economic downturn lead to Romania formally entering the Great Depression.
 17 August – The League Against Usury, a single-issue party founded in response to the Great Depression.
 6 October – The national football team wins the first match of the Balkan Cup at Stadionul Oficiul Național de Educație Fizică in Bucharest. The team goes on to win the cup.

Births
 1 January – Nicolae Linca, boxer, first Romanian to win an Olympic medal, at the 1956 Summer Olympics (died 2008).
 11 February – Paul Barbă Neagră, film director (died 2009).
 24 February – Marga Barbu, actress (died 2009).
 14 March – Iurie Darie, actor (died 2012).
 18 March – Meinhard E. Mayer, mathematician (died 2011).
 13 May – Thea Segall, photographer (died 2009).
 30 May – Doina Cornea, human rights activist and French language professor (died 2018).
 17 July – Márton Balázs, mathematician (died 2016).
 10 August – Tamara Buciuceanu, actress (died 2019).
 19 August – Ion N. Petrovici, neurologist and academic (died 2021).
 22 September – Dinu Cocea, actor, film director, and screenwriter (died 2013). 
 6 October – Mihai Drăgănescu, engineer and President of the  Romanian Academy from 1990 to 1994 (died 2010).
 10 October – Mihai Gavrilă, quantum physicist and a corresponding member of the Romanian Academy.
 9 November – Edith Balas, art historian (died 2016).

Deaths
 29 March – Elena Caragiani-Stoenescu, first Romanian woman aviator (born 1887).
 29 July – Clara Maniu, feminist and suffragist (born 1842).
 17 August – Haia Lifșiț, Communist activist (born 1903).

References

Years of the 20th century in Romania
1920s in Romania
 
Romania
Romania